Sault Ste. Marie Area Public Schools, also known as Sault Area Public Schools, is a public school district headquartered in Sault Ste. Marie, Michigan.

In addition to Sault Ste. Marie, the district includes Soo Township, Sugar Island Township, most of Bruce Township, and portions of Dafter Township.

History

Tim Hall became superintendent circa 2011. In 2021 he retired.

In 2021 all members of the board of education voted to make Amy Scott-Kronemeyer the superintendent.

Schools
Secondary schools:
 Sault Area High School & Career Center
 Malcolm High School
 Sault Area Middle School
Elementary schools:
 Lincoln Elementary School
 Washington Elementary School

References

External links
 Sault Ste. Marie Area Public Schools

School districts in Michigan
Sault Ste. Marie, Michigan
Education in Chippewa County, Michigan